Amitabh Bachchan (born 11 October 1942) is an Indian actor. He first gained popularity in the early 1970s for movies like Zanjeer and Deewaar, and was dubbed India's first "angry young man" for his on-screen roles in Bollywood. Referred to as the "Shahenshah of Bollywood", "Star of the Millennium" or "Big B",
he has since appeared in over 180 Indian films in a career spanning more than four decades. Bachchan is widely regarded as one of the greatest and most influential actors in the history of Indian cinema. So total was his dominance of the movie scene in the 1970s and 1980s that the French director François Truffaut called him a "one-man industry."

Bachchan has won numerous accolades in his career, including four National Film Awards as Best Actor, Dadasaheb Phalke Award as lifetime achievement award and many awards at international film festivals and award ceremonies. He has won sixteen Filmfare Awards and is the most-nominated performer in any major acting category at Filmfare, with 42 nominations overall and also won eleven Screen Awards.

Apart from National Film Awards, Filmfare Awards and other competitive awards which Bachchan won for his performances throughout the years, he has been awarded several honours for his achievements in the Indian film industry.In 1990 he got   Filmfare award for Agneepath.In 1991, he became the first artist to receive the, which was established in the name of Raj Kapoor. Bachchan was crowned as Superstar of the Millennium in 2000 at the Filmfare Awards. The Government of India awarded him with the Padma Shri in 1984, the Padma Bhushan in 2001 and the Padma Vibhushan in 2015. France's highest civilian honour, the Knight of the Legion of Honour, was conferred upon him by the French Government in 2007 for his "exceptional career in the world of cinema and beyond". In 2011, actor Dilip Kumar blogged that Black should have been nominated for an Oscar. Kumar added: "If any Indian actor, in my personal opinion, deserves the world's most coveted award, it is you."

In 1999, Bachchan was voted the "Greatest Star of stage or screen of the Millennium" in a BBC Your Millennium online poll. In 2001, he was honoured with the Actor of the Century award at the Alexandria International Film Festival in Egypt in recognition of his contribution to the world of cinema. Many other honours for his achievements were conferred upon him at several International Film at the 2010 Asian Film Awards.

In 2003, he was conferred with the Honorary Citizenship of the French town of Deauville. In October 2003, he was conferred with the Medal of Honour of Morocco, given to him by King Mohammed at the Marrakech International Film Festival. In October 2003, TIME magazine dubbed Bachchan as "the Undisputed Godfather of Bollywood". In April 2005, The Walter Reade Theater of Lincoln Center in New York honored Amitabh Bachchan with a special tribute, retrospective—titled "Amitabh Bachchan: The Biggest Film Star in the World". In March 2010, he has been named the list of CNN's "top 25 Asian actors of all time".

In June 2000, he became the first living Asian to have been modelled in wax at London's Madame Tussauds Wax Museum. Another statue was installed in New York in 2009, Hong Kong in 2011, Bangkok in 2011, Washington, DC in 2012 and Delhi in 2017.

He was honoured with an honorary doctorate by the University of Jhansi, India, in 2004, the University of Delhi in 2006, the De Montfort University in Leicester, UK, in 2006, the Leeds Metropolitan University in Yorkshire, UK, in 2007, the Queensland University of Technology in Brisbane, Australia, in 2011, the Jodhpur National University in 2013. and the Academy of Arts (Egypt), Egypt, in 2015. In 2017, he was honored with the Indian Film Personality of the Year consisting of a Silver Peacock Medal, a certificate a Civilian award.

On 24 September 2019 he was awarded the prestigious Dadasaheb Phalake award for 2018 by government of India.

Civilian award

 1984 – Padma Shri India's fourth highest civilian award from the Government of India.
 1991 – Order of Afghanistan by the President of Afghanistan.
 2001 – Padma Bhushan, India's third highest civilian honour from the Government of India.
 2007 – officer of the Legion of Honour, France's highest civilian honour from the Government of France for his "exceptional career in the world of cinema and beyond". Describing Bachchan as a "towering Indian personality" and the "number-one actor of Indian cinema", Ambassador Girard said the award "brings Bachchan into the international legion of world's greatest artistes".
 2015 – Padma Vibhushan, India's second highest civilian honour from the Government of India.

Honorary Doctorate

 2004 – Honorary Doctorate by the Jhansi University, India.
 2006 – Honorary Doctorate Degree on by his alma mater University of Delhi, India.
 2006 – Honorary degree of Doctor of Arts by De Montfort University in Leicester, UK in recognition of his distinguished career in films. He is the first Indian star to be feted by a foreign university.
 2007 – Honorary degree of Doctor of Arts by The University Brandan Foster by the Leeds Metropolitan University in Yorkshire, UK.
 2011 – Honorary Doctorate by the Queensland University of Technology in Brisbane, Australia for his contribution to the world of entertainment.
 2013 – Honorary Doctorate by the Jodhpur National University, India for his exceptional contribution to Indian Cinema.
 2015 – Honorary Doctorate from the prestigious Academy of Arts (Egypt) for his contribution to cinema.
 2018 – Honorary Doctorate from Rabindra Bharati University for his contribution to cinema.

National honours

 1980 – Awadh Samman by the Government of Uttar Pradesh.
 1994 – Yash Bharati, Uttar Pradesh's highest honour from the Government of Uttar Pradesh.
 2002 – "Dayawati Modi" Award. This award is among the highest awards in India in the field of Art, Culture and Education.
 2002 – National Kishore Kumar Award by the Government of Madhya Pradesh for excellence in acting and his unparalleled contribution to the film industry.
 2004 – "Living Legend" Award by the Federation of Indian Chamber of Commerce and Industry (FICCI) in recognition of his contribution to the Indian entertainment industry.
 2005 – Deenanath Mangeshkar award for his contribution to films and music.
 2009 – IIFA-FICCI Frames, "Most Powerful Entertainer of the Decade Award" for his contribution to Indian cinema.
 2011 – "Abhinaya Chakravarthy" Award by the President of India Pratibha Patil.
 2011 – "Maharashtrian of the Year-the Maanbindu" Award by the President of India Pratibha Patil.
 2011 – NTR National Award in recognition of his outstanding contribution toIndian Cinema by the Government of Andhra Pradesh.
 2013 – President of India 'Medallion of Honour' for contribution to 100 Years of Indian Cinema.
 2014 – ANR National Award
2019 – Government of India confers Dadasaheb Phalke Award for the year 2018.

National Film Awards

The National Film Awards is the most prominent film award ceremonies in India. Established in 1954, it is administered by the International Film Festival of India and the Indian government's Directorate of Film Festivals. The awards are presented by the President of India. Due to their national scale, they are considered to be the equivalent of the Academy Awards. Bachchan has received four awards (a record) in the Best Actor category and Dadasaheb Phalke Award.

Asian Film Awards

Winner
 2010 – Lifetime Achievement Award during the 4th Asian Film Awards in Hong Kong.

Filmfare Awards

Best Actor

Best Supporting Actor

Best Actor (Critics)

 Honorary awards

Screen Awards

Winner

IIFA Awards

Stardust Awards

Bengal Film Journalists' Association Awards

Zee Cine Awards

Bollywood Movie Awards

Apsara Film & Television Producers Guild Awards

BIG Star Entertainment Awards

People's Choice Awards

Winner
 2012 – Best Non-Fiction Show Host for Kaun Banega Crorepati

Indian Television Academy Awards

{| class="wikitable sortable"
|-
! Year || Category || Show || Result
|-
|2001 || Best Host ||rowspan="2"| Kaun Banega Crorepati (Season 1) || rowspan="9" 
|-
|2001
| rowspan="3" | Best Anchor of a Game Show
|-
| 2005 || rowspan="2" | Kaun Banega Crorepati (Season 2)
|-
| 2006
|-
| 2007 || The ITA Laurel For 'ULTIMATE EMINENCE ||
|-
| 2010 || Best Anchor Talk/Chat Show || Bigg Boss (season 3)
|-
|rowspan="2"| 2011 ||The ITA Achiever of The Year 
|
|-
| rowspan="2" | Best Anchor Game/Quiz Show ||Kaun Banega Crorepati (Season 5)
|-
| 2013 || Kaun Banega Crorepati (Season 7)
|}

Indian Telly Awards

Indian Television AwardsWinner 2000 – Screen Videocon Awards: Best Anchor for Kaun Banega Crorepati.

BIG Television AwardsWinner 2011 – Shaksiyat of the Year for Kaun Banega Crorepati
 2011 – Distinguished Personality Award

Other awardsWinner' 1970 – "Saraswati Award" for Anand 1989 – Lifetime Achievement Award from the Rotary Club of Bombay (Mumbai).
 1997 – "Distinguished Alumni " award at the inaugural function of the platinum jubilee celebrations of the Capital's largest Central University.
 1998 – Lifetime Achievement Award at the Omega Award for Excellence.
 2000 – All-India Critics Association (AICA): Best Actor Award for Sooryavansham.
 2000 – Sansui Viewers Choice Awards: Best Supporting Actor for Mohabbatein.
 2000 – Bollywood People's Choice Awards: Best Supporting Actor for Mohabbatein.
 2001 – Zee Gold Awards: Critics Award for Best Male for Mohabbatein.
 2002 – "Icon of the Millennium" award at the 32nd Rupa AIFA Awards at Bandra.
 2002 – Lifetime Achievement Award by the Sansui Viewers' Choice Movie Awards.
 2003 – MTV Lycra Awards: Maha Style Icon of the Year (First Recipient)
 2003 – "Bollywood's Lifetime Achievement Award" by the London-based Asian Guild.
 2003 – Lifetime Achievement Award at the Sangeet Shiromani Award.
 2003 – FPFAC 'Achiever' Awards: "Achiever of the Year" award.
 2004 – "Radio Voice of the Year" award by Radio Mirchi.
 2004 – Sansui Viewer's Choice Movie Awards: Personality of the Year.
 2005 – "Diamond of India" award by The International Gemological Institute (IGI).
 2005 – NDTV Indian of the Year in Entertainment.
 2006 – Bollywood People's Choice Awards: Best Actor for Black.
 2006 – Anandalok Awards: Best Actor for Black.
 2006 – Bollyvista Film Awards: Best Actor for Black.
 2006 – Rediff Movie Awards: Best Actor for Black.
 2006 – Lifetime Achievement Award at AXN Action Awards.
 2007 – Special Award for his contribution to Indian cinema at the 9th Mumbai Academy of the Moving Image International Film.
 2009 – Lifetime Achievement Award at Gentleman Quarterly magazine's "Men of the Year" Award.
 2009 – Lifetime Achievement Award for completing 40 years in the entertainment industry at the 11th Mumbai Academy of Moving Images (MAMI).
 2009 – NDTV Indian of the Year Awards: NDTV icon of 21 years of Entertainment award.
 2010 – Special Award at the Marathi International Film and Theatre Awards (MIFTA) for his excellent work in films.
 2010 – Lines Gold Award: Best Actor for Paa.
 2010 – 'FICCI Frames 2010' Excellence Awards: Best Actor for Paa.
 2010 – "Taj Enlighten Tareef Award" for his contribution to Indian film industry.
 2010 – "Timeless Icon" award at the 'Hello! Hall of Fame'.
 2010 – Lifetime Achievement Award by Asianet Film Awards.
 2010 – The Asian Awards: Lifetime Achievement Award.
 2011 – CNN-IBN Indian of the Year in Entertainment.
 2012 – Lifetime Achievement Award at the Pune International Film Festival (PIFF) for contribution to cinema.
 2012 – 'FICCI Frames 2012' Excellence Awards: "Award for maximum impact made by a Personality".
 2012 – Phalke Ratna Award at the Dadasaheb Phalke Academy Awards.
 2012 – Honoured as the "John Walker & Sons Game Changer of the Century" for his Achievements.
 2012 – South Indian Education Society (SIES) Sri Chandrashekarendra Saraswati National Eminence award.
 2012 – Mirchi Music Awards Living Legend With Golden Voice
 2013 – Honoured by University of Mumbai.
 2013 – Crowned "India's Prime Icon of 2012".
 2013 – "Timeless Style Icon".
 2013 – NASSCOM Global Leadership Awards: "Global Indian Award" for being the ambassador for Indian cinema.
 2013 – Honoured by the Rotary International.
 2013 – Maestro Award by the Whistling Woods International Institute.
 2013 – "Super Achiever of the Year" Award by Society Magazine in Mumbai.
 2013 – Honoured with "Hridaynath Mangeshkar Award" for his contribution in the film industry.
 2013 – Honoured at the Rashtrapati Bhavan as one of NDTV's 25 greatest living global Indians.
 2014 – Honoured with the "Pune Pandit Award" – 2013 by The Art & Music Foundation for honouring & celebrating his accomplishments with 100 years of Indian Cinema
 2014 – "Global Icon of the Year" award at the NRI of the Year awards.
 2014 – Honoured with "Box office Shahenshah Award" at the Star Box Office India Awards.
 2014 – Yash Chopra Memorial Award.
 2014 – Indian Film Festival of Melbourne: IFFM Excellence in Cinema Award.
 2015 – 'Social Media Person of the Year' award by the Internet and Mobile Association of India (IAMAI).
 2015 – Filmfare Glamour & Style Awards: Timeless Glamour and Style Icon (Male).
 2016 – NDTV Indian of the Year 2015 Awards: Lifetime Achievement.
 2016 – TOIFA Awards: Best Actor (Critics Choice) Male Piku''.
 2016 – TOIFA Awards: Lifetime Achievement Award.
 2016 – GQ awards: The GQ Legend Award.
 2018 – Femina Beauty Awards: Style Legend of All Time.
 2018 – Sayaji Ratna Award by Baroda Management Association
 2023 – Living Legend at the India UK Achievers Honours.

Madame Tussauds
 In June 2000, Bachchan became the first living Asian to have been immortalised in wax at Madame Tussauds London.
 In May 2009, a lifelike wax figure of Bachchan has been unveiled at the newly launched 'Bollywood Zone' in Madame Tussauds at Times Square in New York.
 In March 2011, Bachchan's wax image has been unveiled at the "World Famous Home of the Famous" Madame Tussauds Hong Kong.
 In August 2011, Bachchan's wax image has been unveiled at Madame Tussauds museum Bangkok.
 On 5 December 2012, Bachchan's wax image has been unveiled at Madame Tussauds museum Washington, DC.
 On 13 January 2017, Bachchan's wax image has been unveiled at Madame Tussauds museum Delhi.

International honours and recognition
 In July 1999, Bachchan was named the "Greatest Star of stage or screen of the Millennium" by BBC online poll where he defeated many Hollywood legends such as Alec Guinness, Marlon Brando, Laurence Olivier and Charlie Chaplin.
 In 2001, he was ranked as the "Most Powerful Indian Film Star" by Forbes.
 On 10 September 2001 he was awarded the "Actor of the Century" award at the Alexandria International Film Festival. Egyptian Minister of Culture Farouk Hosni presented Bachchan with the award in recognition of his contribution to international cinema.
 On 14 March 2003, he was conferred with the honorary citizenship of the French town of Deauville at the fifth edition of the Asian film festival. An honour earlier bestowed on only two people, Queen Elizabeth II and the Soviet space hero, Yuri Gagarin.
 In October 2003, he was conferred with the Medal of Honour of Morocco, given to him by King Mohammed at the Marrakech International Film Festival. 
 In October 2003, TIME magazine dubbed Bachchan as "the Undisputed Godfather of Bollywood". He was also featured in its list of Bollywood's Brightest Stars.
 In April 2005, The Walter Reade Theater of Lincoln Center in New York honored Amitabh Bachchan with a special tribute, retrospective—titled "Amitabh Bachchan: The Biggest Film Star in the World". The tribute also included "An Evening with Amitabh Bachchan", a live appearance by Bachchan hosted at the Lincoln Center's Alice Tully Hall.
 He was honoured along with actors and directors from Hollywood at an International Film Festival in Rabat, Morocco.
 In the weekend of 16 and 17 June June 2007, the British Academy of Film and Television Arts (BAFTA) hosts a Bachchan spectacular retrospective to honour Bachchan's stellar career. The Chairman of BAFTA ended the event by announcing Bachchan as an honorary Life-Time member of BAFTA.
 On 22 November 2007 he was honoured by the London Mayor Ken Livingstone with "The Visit London Special Award for Outstanding Achievement" for his contribution to Indian cinema in the last 30 years.
 On 15 January 2009, Le Salon du Cinema (Cinema Fair) in Paris paid tribute to Indian Cinema for their new edition, with Bachchan being the guest of honour. He also launched a retrospective of his films.
 On 31 January 2009, he was honoured with the World Economic Forum's Crystal Award at Davos for his contribution to the world of art.
 In 2009, the Tehran Film Festival has invited Bachchan to receive the Lifetime Achievement Award.
 In December 2009, he was honoured with a Lifetime Achievement Award at the Dubai International Film Festival for his outstanding contribution to cinema.
 In December 2009, he was honoured with the 8th Asian Film Cultural Award for his contribution to cinema for 40 years.
 In February 2010, he was honoured with a Lifetime Achievement Award at the Sixth Muscat, Oman International Film Festival (Miff).
 In March 2010, he has been named the list of CNN's "top 25 Asian actors of all time".
 In March 2010, he has won the Lifetime Achievement Award at the 34th Hong Kong International Film Festival.
 In October 2010, he was honoured with a Lifetime Achievement Award at The Asian Awards in London.
 In April 2012, he was conferred the Polio Eradication Champion award by Rotary International for his invaluable support to the Polio Eradication Programme in India.
 In July 2012, he was given the due honor to carry the Olympic torch during the last leg of its relay in London's Southwark.
 In November 2012, he was honoured by the Australian Government for his remarkable contribution to the Indian cinema, which is celebrating its centenary year.
 In December 2012, he was honoured with the Tribute to Hindi Cinema Award at the 12th Marrakech International Film Festival.
 On 10 December 2012, he was honoured with the "Keys to the City of Florence" at the River to River. Florence Indian Film Festival in Italy.
 In May 2013, he will be honoured with "La Trobe University Global Citizenship Award" by the La Trobe University in Melbourne. The University is also introducing a Phd Scholarship called Shri Amitabh Bachchan Scholarship.
 In May 2013, he will be honoured with "International Screen Icon" award by the Victorian Government and the "Ambassador of Goodwill" award from the Vice Chancellor of La Trobe University in Melbourne.
 In September 2013, he was honoured with the "Global Diversity Award" in the British Parliament. Speaker of the House of Commons, presented the ornately sculpted glass Award to Bachchan and describing him as "a Bollywood icon and the most famous Indian film star of all time".
 In March 2014, he was honoured with the "Global Icon of the Year" award at the NRI of the Year awards.
 In May 2014, he was honoured with the "International Screen Icon" award during the inaugural awards ceremony at the Indian Film Festival of Melbourne (IFFM).
 In March 2021, he was honoured with the "International Federation of Film Archives (FIAF)" award for his contribution in preserving India’s film heritage.

Other recognition
 2005 – Ranked as the "Most popular Star in India" by the Hansa Research's new syndicated study, Celebrity Track.
 2009 – He is called among the "Top 5 Most Influential Indians of the Decade".

Polls
 2002 – Voted the "Hottest Male Vegetarian" by 'People for the Ethical Treatment of Animals' (PETA).
 2003 – Voted the "Greatest Actor" in the film personalities category in the Best of India poll conducted by Zee News.
 2006 – Voted "Entertainer of the Year"
 2006 – Voted "Real Star of Stars" by reader's choice.
 2008 – Voted "Asia's Sexiest Vegetarian man"
 2012 – Voted "India's Greatest Actor" in NDTV poll.
 2012 – Voted "Most-Admired Bollywood Actor" in a new mobile survey.
 2012 – Voted the "Hottest Male Vegetarian" for the fourth time by 'People for the Ethical Treatment of Animals' (PETA).
 2013 – Voted the "Greatest Bollywood Star" in a UK poll celebrating 100 years of Indian cinema.
 2017 – Topped in India Today poll as the most popular actor of Hindi cinema till date.
 2019 – Ranked No. 6 in POWER LIST 2019 – 50 MOST POWERFUL PEOPLE IN INDIA by India Today
 2019 – Topped India Most Trusted Personality by TRA Research.
 2020– Topped India Most Trusted Personality by TRA Research.

See also
 List of accolades received by Piku

References

Lists of awards received by Indian actor
Awards